La Chimba Airport was an airport serving Antofagasta, capital of the Antofagasta Region of Chile.

Google Earth Historical Imagery (10/19/2002) shows the runway marked closed and criss-crossed by new streets. Subsequent imagery show the land filled by a housing project.

See also

Transport in Chile
List of airports in Chile

References

External links 

OpenStreetMap - La Chimba

Defunct airports
Airports in Antofagasta Region